Sirohi is a city, located in Sirohi district in southern Rajasthan state in western India. It is the administrative headquarters of Sirohi District and was formerly the capital of the princely state of Sirohi ruled by Deora Chauhan Rajput rulers. The nearest railway station to Sirohi is Sirohi Road railway station. Sirohi got first rank in 33 districts of Rajasthan for "Swachha Bharat Abhiyaan” in year 2014.

Geography
It has an average elevation of 321 metres (1053 ft).

History
In 1405, Rao Sobhaji founded the town of Shivpuri on the eastern slope of Siranwa Hill. Shivpuri today lies in ruins. In 1425, Sobhaji's son and successor, Sehastramal (or Sainsmal), founded a fortress on the eastern slope of the same hill, which became his capital and grew into the present-day town of Sirohi.

See also
Pavapuri
Sirohi (Rajasthan Assembly Constituency)
Jawan Singh (politician)
Mirpur Jain Temple

Notes

References

 — also shows the state's flag

External links

Cities and towns in Sirohi district